The Accra Technical University was established in 1949 as a Technical School in Ghana and commissioned in 1957 as Accra Technical Institute and converted into a Technical University by the Parliament of Ghana in 2013.

History

Establishment 
Accra Technical University was the first Technical University to be established. It was established in 1949 as a Technical School and commissioned in 1957 as Accra Technical Institute. In 1963, the Institute was renamed Accra Polytechnic, by the orders of the then President, Dr. Kwame Nkrumah. By the Polytechnic Law of 1992 (PNDC 321), which became fully operative in the 1993/1994 academic year, Accra Technical University was elevated to a tertiary status. The institution was then placed under the Higher Education Council with autonomy to award Higher National Diplomas (through the National Board for Professional and Technician Examinations [NABPTEX]).

With the passage of the PNDC Law 321, the University upgraded its programmes and facilities in  it to provide middle-level manpower to revolutionise and feed the growing Ghanaian industries. Notwithstanding the difficulties that characterized the sudden change over from secondary to a tertiary status, Accra Technical University made a tremendous progress in its review and expansion of curricula to suit contemporary needs. Accra Technical University began to offer Higher National Diploma (HND) programmes in Mechanical Engineering, Electrical/Electronic Engineering, Building Technology, Civil Engineering, Furniture Design and Production, Secretaryship and Management Studies, Bilingual Secretaryship and Management Studies, Accountancy, Marketing, Purchasing and Supply, Hotel Catering and Institutional Management, Fashion Design and Textiles, Mathematics and Statistics, and Science Laboratory Technology. The technician courses offered by the Polytechnic were maintained.

University status 
In 2007 the Polytechnic Act (Act 745) was promulgated and it repealed PNDC Law 321 of 1992. This Act has granted the Polytechnics autonomy to award the Higher National Diplomas (HND), Diplomas and other Certificates accredited by the National Accreditation Board (NAB), and award Degrees subject to the conditions that the council of that Polytechnic may determine. Accra Technical University currently, offers ten (10) Degree (Btec) and fifteen (15) HND Programmes. These programmes are run in three schools. As a tertiary institution, Accra Technical University is governed by a Council established under the Technical University Act

2016 (Act 745).

Campus 
The campus is located at Barnes road, Accra

Academics 
The university has five faculties.

Faculty of Engineering 
 Department of Mechanical Engineering 
 Department of Electrical/Electronic Engineering
 Department of Civil Engineering

Faculty of Built Environment 
 Department of Interior Design and Upholstery Technology 
 Department of Building Technology

Faculty of Applied Sciences 
 Applied Mathematics and Statistics
 Science Laboratory Technology
 Computer Science
 Medical Laboratory Technology

Faculty of Applied Arts 
 Department of Hotel Catering & Institutional Management (HCIM)
 Fashion Design & Textile Department

Faculty of Business 
 Accountancy and Finance
 Management and Public Administration 
 Procurement and Supply Chain Management.
 Marketing

HND Programmes 
With the upgrade in status, the technician courses previously offered by the school were maintained, and Higher National Diploma (HND) programmes in the following fields were added:

 Mechanical Engineering
 Electrical/Electronic Engineering
 Building Technology
 Civil Engineering
 Furniture Design and Production
 Secretaryship and Management Studies
 Bilingual Secretaryship and Management Studies
 Accountancy
 Marketing
 Purchasing and Supply
 Hotel Catering and Institutional Management
 Fashion Design and Textiles
 Mathematics and Statistics
 Science Laboratory Technology
 Medical Laboratory Science

References

Polytechnics in Ghana
Education in Accra
Educational institutions established in 1949
1949 establishments in Gold Coast (British colony)
Universities in Ghana